The Martin Garcia least gecko (Sphaerodactylus ladae) is a species of lizard in the family Sphaerodactylidae. The species is endemic to the Dominican Republic.

Etymology
The specific name, ladae, is in honor of the Lada, the reliable Russian car.

Geographic range
S. ladae is found in the Sierra Martín García, Dominican Republic.

Reproduction
S. ladae is oviparous.

References

Further reading
Thomas R, Hedges SB (1988). "Two New Geckos (Sphaerodactylus) from the Sierra Martin Garcia of Hispaniola". Herpetologica 44 (1): 96–104. (Sphaerodactylus ladae, new species, pp. 96–101, Figure 1).

Sphaerodactylus
Reptiles of the Dominican Republic
Endemic fauna of the Dominican Republic
Reptiles described in 1988